The 2009 Georgia Southern Eagles team represented Georgia Southern University in the 2009 NCAA Division I FCS football season. The Eagles were led by third-year head coach Chris Hatcher, who was fired following the conclusion of the season, and played their home games at Paulson Stadium. They were a member of the Southern Conference. They finished the season 5–6, 4–4 in Southern Conference play.

Schedule

References

Georgia Southern
Georgia Southern Eagles football seasons
Georgia Southern Eagles football